Radius is a 2017 Canadian science fiction thriller film directed and written by Caroline Labrèche and Steeve Léonard. It stars Diego Klattenhoff, Charlotte Sullivan, and Brett Donahue. Klattenhoff and Sullivan play two survivors of a car accident who discover that one causes the death of anyone who comes within a certain radius of him, and the other has the ability to nullify this effect.

Plot
A man wakes bloodied and disoriented from a car crash.  He staggers to the road and flags down help from a passing motorist, but the driver dies suddenly after swerving off the road.  After calling for help on his cell phone, he realizes he does not know where he is or what his name is.  Checking his wallet, he learns his name is Liam Hartwell.  While heading back into town, Liam stops at a roadside diner, where he finds everyone dead.  At his house, news reports speculate a virus may be responsible, and in response he covers his nose and mouth with cloth for protection.  When he notices a nearby farmer, he attempts to warn the man to leave the area.  The farmer approaches Liam and suddenly drops dead.  When Liam notices animals also die when he approaches, he realizes he is the cause of the unexplained deaths, not a virus.

A woman also suffering from amnesia comes looking for Liam at his house, revealing that she was with him during the car accident. He is surprised when she can approach him without dying, and he agrees to talk with her.  Neither knows why they were traveling together, nor what caused the crash.  Liam does not mention his theory about the deaths but presses the woman, dubbed Jane Doe, for details about whether anything weird has happened to her.  When she says that hospital tests showed nothing out of the ordinary, they investigate the site of the crash.  They find a charred circle, and Liam finally explains his theory.  Jane reacts fearfully, insisting that he stay away from her. A passing cop sees their altercation and questions Liam.  She drops dead as soon as Jane walks off.

Using a goat, Liam proves to Jane that any living creature who approaches him dies unless Jane is within . Liam at first wants to contact the authorities, but Jane convinces him they will not believe him.  Instead, she suggests he be tested at a hospital.  The police arrive at the hospital as the doctor reveals Liam is healthy. Worried the police may attempt to separate them, Liam and Jane flee. Jane pauses at a missing persons board, remembering something about a poster.  When she comes to, she sees Liam has already entered an elevator. She races to follow it as closely as possible. Liam urges the occupants to leave as soon as the doors open, and he tries to isolate himself until Jane can rejoin him. They finally leave the hospital together, relieved nobody has died.

News reports reveal Jane's real name to be Rose Daerwood. Her husband, Sam, appeals for her to come home. Though cautious, Rose suggests they ask him for help.  Sam does not believe their story at first, but Liam once again demonstrates by killing animals who get too close to him. Sam explains that Rose disappeared while searching for her long-lost twin sister, Lily. Rose remembers becoming suicidal and that Liam saved her life. As Liam and Rose grow closer, Sam becomes jealous and warns Rose that she does not even know Liam. This worsens when Liam and Rose insist on fleeing together to Liam's remote cabin without Sam. Sam calls the cops but regrets doing so, warning them at the last moment. The cops and multiple onlookers die while separating Liam and Rose, forcing Sam to agree to their original plan.

On the way to the cabin, they learn an unexplained cosmic anomaly struck the Earth in the spot where they had their accident. While exploring the cabin, Rose discovers evidence that Liam is a serial killer who abducted and killed Lily. Separately, Liam remembers attempting to abduct and kill Rose at the time of the cosmic anomaly. As Rose confronts Liam, a father and his sons take both Rose and Liam hostage. The father instructs his sons to kill Liam, whom he dubs a terrorist. Rose initially protests but allows them to separate her from Liam. When one of the boys and his father die, the remaining son shoots Rose.  Liam's aura kills the remaining son, and he takes Rose to the hospital. There, as Rose and Liam are separated, Liam shoots himself in the head to prevent more people from dying due to his aura.

Cast
 Diego Klattenhoff as Liam Hartwell
 Charlotte Sullivan as Jane / Rose Grayson Daerwood / Lily Grayson
 Brett Donahue as Sam Daerwood

Production
The initial idea came from two sources.  The first one was the climactic reveal from Oldboy, where two characters were revealed to have a secret connection.  The second was an old comic book storyline in which Superman was helpless to save people because they would die if they came into contact with him. Shooting took place in Manitoba, starting in June 2016.

Release
Radius premiered at the Fantasia International Film Festival on 17 July 2017.

Critical response
On review aggregator website Rotten Tomatoes, the film has an approval rating of 93% based on 15 reviews and an average rating of 7.30/10.

References

External links
 
 
 Radius at The Numbers

2017 films
2010s mystery drama films
2010s science fiction thriller films
2010s serial killer films
Canadian science fiction thriller films
Canadian serial killer films
English-language Canadian films
Films about death
Films about missing people
Films about road accidents and incidents
Films directed by Caroline Labrèche
Films directed by Steeve Léonard
Films set in Canada
Films shot in Manitoba
Murder–suicide in films
2017 drama films
2010s English-language films
2010s Canadian films